Peterskopf may refer to:

 Peterskopf (Haardt), a hill in Germany
 Peterskopf (Kellerwald), a mountain in Germany